Andrea Šimara (born 13 July 1997) is a Croatian handballer for RK Podravka Koprivnica and the Croatian national team.

She represented Croatia at the 2020 European Women's Handball Championship.

International honours
EHF European Cup:
Runner-up: 2021

References

External links

1997 births
Living people
Croatian female handball players
Handball players from Zagreb
Competitors at the 2022 Mediterranean Games
Mediterranean Games silver medalists for Croatia
Mediterranean Games medalists in handball
RK Podravka Koprivnica players
21st-century Croatian women